Prof. Dr. hab. Andrzej Gąsiorowski  (born in 1950) is a research scientist at the Stutthof concentration camp Museum in Sztutowo, Professor in the Institute of Politology, Faculty of Social Sciences of the Gdańsk University, awarded the title of profesor zwyczajny by the President of Poland Bronisław Komorowski. He served as President of the Regional Commission of the Institute of National Remembrance (IPN) in Gdańsk and, at present, is the President of the Scientific Advisory to Instytut Bałtycki. Gąsiorowski specializes in World War II history of Poland, with focus on the anti-Nazi resistance in Pomerania. He is the author of books and monographs on this subject including genocidal operations against Poles by Nazi Germany such as the Intelligenzaktion and the massacres in Piaśnica.

Life
Gąsiorowski was born in Subkowy in northern Poland. He graduated at the Department of History of the Gdańsk University Faculty of Humanism, and received his doctorate in 1979. He habilitated in 2000 at the Faculty of Historical Sciences of the Nicolaus Copernicus University in Toruń. He is a member of the Komitet Ochrony Pamięci Walk i Męczeństwa in Gdańsk. Gąsiorowski is the author and co-author of books devoted to Gdańsk Pomerania, notably to the underground paramilitary Polish Scouting Association Szare Szeregi, and Polish underground Navy in 1939-1945.

Works
 Pomorze Gdańskie w świetle wydawnictw konspiracyjnych 1939-1945,
 Szare Szeregi na Pomorzu w latach 1939-1945, published in 1998
 Polska Armia Powstania. Największa tajemnica konspiracji pomorskiej, published in 1997
 Wydział Marynarki Wojennej Komendy Głównej AK kryptonim "Alfa", published in 2001

Notes and references

 

20th-century Polish historians
Polish male non-fiction writers
Academic staff of the University of Gdańsk
University of Gdańsk alumni
Nicolaus Copernicus University in Toruń alumni
21st-century Polish historians
People from Tczew County
1950 births
Living people